Estradiol dipropionate (EDP), sold under the brand names Agofollin, Di-Ovocylin, and Progynon DP among others, is an estrogen medication which has been used in hormone therapy for menopausal symptoms and low estrogen levels in women and in the treatment of gynecological disorders. It has also been used in feminizing hormone therapy for transgender women and in the treatment of prostate cancer in men. Although widely used in the past, estradiol dipropionate has largely been discontinued and is mostly no longer available today. It appears to remain in use only in Japan, Macedonia, and Australia. Estradiol dipropionate is given by injection into muscle at intervals ranging from once or twice a week to once every week and a half to two weeks.

Side effects of estradiol dipropionate include breast tenderness, breast enlargement, nausea, headache, and fluid retention. Estradiol dipropionate is an estrogen and hence is an agonist of the estrogen receptor, the biological target of estrogens like estradiol. It is an estrogen ester and a prodrug of estradiol in the body. Because of this, it is considered to be a natural and bioidentical form of estrogen.

Estradiol dipropionate was patented in 1937 and was introduced for medical use by 1940. It was one of the earliest estradiol esters to be used. Along with estradiol benzoate, estradiol dipropionate was among the most widely used esters of estradiol for many years following its introduction.

Medical uses
The medical uses of estradiol dipropionate are the same as those of estradiol and other estrogens. Estradiol dipropionate is used in hormone therapy for the treatment of menopausal symptoms such as hot flashes and vaginal atrophy and in the treatment of hypoestrogenism and delayed puberty due to hypogonadism or other causes in women. It is also used in feminizing hormone therapy for transgender women. Aside from hormone therapy, estradiol dipropionate is used in the treatment of gynecological disorders such as menstrual disorders, dysfunctional uterine bleeding, and breast engorgement. In addition, it is used as a form of high-dose estrogen therapy in the palliative treatment of prostate cancer in men.

Estradiol dipropionate has typically been used at a dosage of 1 to 5 mg once or twice per week by intramuscular injection for relevant indications. It has been used in the treatment of menopausal symptoms at a dosage of 1 to 5 mg initially for two to three injections and 1 to 2.5 mg for maintenance once every 10 to 14 days, and in the treatment of hypoestrogenism and delayed puberty at a dosage of 2.5 to 5 mg once per week. As a component of feminizing hormone therapy for transgender women, estradiol dipropionate has been used at dosages of 2 to 10 mg once per week or 5 to 20 mg once every 2 weeks. In the treatment of prostate cancer, estradiol dipropionate has been used at a dosage of 5 mg once per week.

Available forms

Estradiol dipropionate was previously available by itself as an oil solution for intramuscular injection provided as vials and ampoules at concentrations of 0.1, 0.2, 0.5, 1, 2.5, and 5 mg/mL. The medication has largely been discontinued, with most of these formulations no longer being available. Estradiol dipropionate remains available at a concentration of 1 mg/mL in combination with 50 mg/mL hydroxyprogesterone caproate under the brand name EP Hormone Depot (Teikoku Zoki Pharmaceutical Company) in Japan.

Contraindications

Contraindications of estrogens include coagulation problems, cardiovascular diseases, liver disease, and certain hormone-sensitive cancers such as breast cancer and endometrial cancer, among others.

Side effects

The side effects of estradiol dipropionate are the same as those of estradiol. Examples of such side effects include breast tenderness and enlargement, nausea, bloating, edema, headache, and melasma.

Overdose

Symptoms of estrogen overdosage may include nausea, vomiting, bloating, increased weight, water retention, breast tenderness, vaginal discharge, heavy legs, and leg cramps. These side effects can be diminished by reducing the estrogen dosage.

Interactions

Inhibitors and inducers of cytochrome P450 may influence the metabolism of estradiol and by extension circulating estradiol levels.

Pharmacology

Pharmacodynamics

Estradiol dipropionate is an estradiol ester, or a prodrug of estradiol. As such, it is an estrogen, or an agonist of the estrogen receptors. Estradiol dipropionate is of about 41% higher molecular weight than estradiol due to the presence of its C3 and C17β propionate esters. Because estradiol dipropionate is a prodrug of estradiol, it is considered to be a natural and bioidentical form of estrogen.

Pharmacokinetics

Compared to estradiol benzoate, a related estradiol ester, estradiol dipropionate has enhanced and prolonged effects. Whereas the duration of action of estradiol benzoate is said to be 2 to 3 days, the duration of estradiol dipropionate has been said to be 1 to 2 weeks. However, newer estradiol esters have longer durations than either estradiol benzoate or estradiol dipropionate; the duration of estradiol valerate has been said to be 1 to 3 weeks, and the duration of estradiol cypionate has been said to be 3 to 4 weeks. A single intramuscular injection of 5 mg estradiol dipropionate has a duration of about 5 to 8 days.

A single intramuscular injection of 50 μg/kg estradiol dipropionate in oil in 15 pubertal girls (about 1 mg for a 50-kg (110-lb) girl) was found to produce peak estradiol levels of about 215 pg/mL after 1.5 days. Estradiol levels declined to about 90 pg/mL after 4 days.

Chemistry

Estradiol dipropionate, also known as estradiol 3,17β-dipropionate, is a synthetic estrane steroid and a derivative of estradiol. It is an estrogen ester; specifically, it is the C3,17β dipropionate ester of estradiol.

The experimental octanol/water partition coefficient (logP) of estradiol dipropionate is 4.9.

History
Estradiol dipropionate was first synthesized and patented in 1937. It was assessed in clinical studies by 1939 and was introduced by Ciba as an oil solution for use by intramuscular injection under the brand name Di-Ovocylin by the same year. Other formulations such as Ovocyclin P by Ciba, Progynon DP by Schering and Dimenformon Dipropionate by Roche-Organon were also marketed by the early 1940s. Later in the 1940s the brand name Di-Ovocylin was changed by Ciba to Ovocylin Dipropionate. Along with estradiol benzoate, which was introduced in 1933, estradiol dipropionate was one of the first estradiol esters to be introduced for medical use. Prior to the development and introduction of longer-acting estradiol esters like estradiol valerate and estradiol cypionate in the 1950s, estradiol dipropionate and estradiol benzoate were the most widely used estradiol esters.

Society and culture

Generic names

Brand names
Estradiol dipropionate has been marketed under a variety of brand names, including Agofollin, Akrofolline, Dihidrofolina "Kével", Dimenformon, Dimenformon Dipropionate, Diovocylin, Di-Ovocylin, Diprostron, Diprovex, Endofollicolina D.P., EP Hormone Depot (in combination with hydroxyprogesterone caproate), Estroici, Estronex, Follicyclin, Follicyclin P, Follikelmon Depot, Horiken-Depot, Nacyclyl, Oestradiol Galenika, Oestradiol Streuli, Orofollina, Ovacrin, Ovahormon Depot, Ovocylin, Ovocylin Dipropionate, Ovocylin P, and Progynon DP, among others. Agofollin was an oil solution of estradiol dipropionate that was previously marketed in the Czech Republic and Slovakia.

Availability
Estradiol dipropionate has been discontinued in most countries, but remains available in Japan and Macedonia alone under the brand names Ovahormon and Oestradiol Galenika and/or in combination with hydroxyprogesterone caproate under the brand name EP Hormone Depot. It is also marketed for use in veterinary medicine in combination with hydroxyprogesterone caproate and nandrolone decanoate under the brand name Reepair in Australia.

See also
 Estradiol dipropionate/hydroxyprogesterone caproate

References

Abandoned drugs
Antigonadotropins
Estradiol esters
Hormonal antineoplastic drugs
Prodrugs
Propionate esters
Synthetic estrogens